Adrian Sosnovschi (born 13 June 1977) is a Moldovan football manager and a former player who played as a defender. He also holds Russian citizenship.

Management career
On 11 April 2018, Sosnovschi was appointed as the new manager of FC Atyrau.

References

External links

 

1977 births
Living people
Moldovan footballers
Moldova international footballers
Moldovan expatriate footballers
Expatriate footballers in Russia
Expatriate footballers in Ukraine
Association football defenders
FC Kairat players
FC Dynamo Kyiv players
Expatriate footballers in Kazakhstan
FC Saturn Ramenskoye players
Russian Premier League players
FC Torpedo Moscow players
FC Chernomorets Novorossiysk players
FC Spartak Moscow players
Moldovan expatriate sportspeople in Kazakhstan
CSF Bălți players
FC SKA-Khabarovsk players
FC Milsami Orhei managers
FC Atyrau managers
Moldovan people of Russian descent
Moldovan football managers
Moldovan Super Liga players
Moldovan Super Liga managers